A machete is a broad blade used either as an implement like an axe, or in combat like a short sword.

Machete may also refer to:

Film
 Machete (1958 film), directed by Kurt Neumann
 Machete (2010 film), directed by Robert Rodriguez
 Machete (character), played by Danny Trejo in multiple Robert Rodriguez films

Music
 Machete (musical instrument)
 Machete Music, a record label

Songs
 "Machete", by Buckethead
 "Machete", by Daddy Yankee
 "Machete", by DJ Hazard
 "Machete", by Moby
 "Machete", by Tito & Tarantula
 "Machete", by Amanda Palmer

People
 Nickname of Juan Carlos Arias Acosta, Colombian cyclist
 Ringname of Ricky Vega, Puerto Rican American professional wrestler

Places
 Machete, Guayama, Puerto Rico, a barrio

Other uses
 Machete (comics), any of three fictional characters from the Marvel Comics Universe
 Machete, imprint of Ohio State University Press
 Machete (TV series)
 Control Machete, a band